Liguus is a genus of large tropical air-breathing land snails, more specifically arboreal or tree snails, terrestrial pulmonate gastropod mollusks in the family Orthalicidae.

These snails are especially notable for their relatively large size, and for their often brightly colored shells, which sometimes have complex color patterning. Because of their visual appeal, the shells have been the target of heavy collection pressure — a serious issue since some varieties are very scarce, and some are believed to have become extinct in the 20th century.

Distribution
The genus Liguus is restricted to some of the Greater Antilles (Cuba, Hispaniola) and to Florida. Four of the species, Liguus virgineus (Hispaniola), L. blainianus (Habana and Pinar del Río Provinces, Cuba), L. flammellus (Pinar del Río Province, Cuba), and L. vittatus (Oriente Province, Cuba [since 1976, divided into five new provinces]), have localized ranges, while the numerous subspecies of Liguus fasciatus are more widely distributed, in both Cuba and southern Florida.

Description
The shells of Liguus are more slender than those of Orthalicus, the only other orthalicine genus with which it is likely to be confused. The shape of Liguus shells is characterized by Pilsbry as "oblong-conic", versus "ovate-conic" for Orthalicus.

Species

Five species are now usually recognized in the genus Liguus:
Liguus virgineus (Linnaeus, 1767) - type species of the genus Liguus
Liguus blainianus (Poey, 1851)
Liguus fasciatus (Müller, 1774)
Liguus flammellus (Clench, 1934)
Liguus vittatus (Swainson, 1822)

Many more species have been recognized in the past based on color varieties in the shell, but these taxa have largely been synonymized or placed as lesser level taxa under one or another of these five named species.

Habitat
These snails are found on trees of many species, usually ones with smooth bark: false tamarind (Lysiloma latisiliquum), gumbo-limbo (Bursera simaruba), pigeonplum (Coccoloba diversifolia), black ironwood (Krugiodendron ferreum), false mastic (Sideroxylon foetidissimum), poisonwood (Metopium toxiferum), and Jamaica fishpoisontree (Piscidia piscipula), among others. In most cases, tropical forests suitable for Liguus have at least some surficial limestone, and limestone outcroppings are often present.

References

External links
 

Orthalicidae
Fauna of Hispaniola